Livada (formerly also Șarchiuz, from its Hungarian name of Sárköz, Hungarian pronunciation:)) is a town in north-western Romania, in Satu Mare County. It received town status in 2006. The town administers three villages: Adrian, Dumbrava and Livada Mică.

Demographics

The national census of 2011 recorded a total population of 6,639 of whom: 
60.8% were of Hungarian ethnic origin, 
35.5% of Romanian ethnic origin and
3.2% Roma ethnic origin

Religious affiliations were:
31% Orthodox
26% Roman Catholic 
25% Greek Catholic
17% Reformed

References

Towns in Romania
Populated places in Satu Mare County